Time and Materials is the first collaborative studio album by Serengeti & Open Mike Eagle, released under the group moniker Cavanaugh. It was released on Mello Music Group on November 19, 2015. Entirely produced by Open Mike Eagle, it features guest appearances from P.O.S, Hemlock Ernst, and Busdriver. It is a concept album about "a couple of maintenance veterans named Dave and Mike who work in Cavanaugh, a fictional mixed-income housing unit in the also-fictional town of Detroit, Florida."

Critical reception

Nate Patrin of Pitchfork gave the album a 7.2 out of 10, writing, "for his first full-length production job, Mike sets a tone as raw-nerved and abrasively contemplative as the concept demands." Brett Uddenberg of San Diego Reader wrote, "this is a dense and diverse record that plays to the songwriting strengths of Mike and Serengeti and hints at greater things to come as their partnership evolves."

Spin placed it at number 44 on the "50 Best Hip-Hop Albums of 2015" list.

Track listing

Personnel
Credits adapted from liner notes.

 Open Mike Eagle – vocals, production
 Serengeti – vocals
 P.O.S – vocals (4)
 Busdriver – vocals (4)
 Hemlock Ernst – vocals (4, 9)
 Committee – mixing
 Daddy Kev – mastering
 Stephen Eichhorn – cover photography

References

External links
 

2015 albums
Serengeti (rapper) albums
Open Mike Eagle albums
Mello Music Group albums